Bardahl is a brand of petroleum oil additives, lubricants and gasoline additives for motor vehicles and internal combustion engines made by Bardahl Manufacturing Corporation in Seattle, Washington.

Ole Bardahl
Bardahl Oil Company was founded in 1939 by Ole Bardahl (January 28, 1902 – August 11, 1989), a Norwegian immigrant to the United States.  Ole Bardahl  arrived in Seattle in 1922 with $29 in his pocket. He became a millionaire by the age of 39 as a general contractor in Seattle, building homes. After that, he founded the Bardahl Oil Company in the Ballard neighborhood of Seattle. The company is still owned and managed by the Bardahl family.

1950s
Its original factories were located in Ballard. In the mid-1950s, Bardahl was the leading brand of motor oil and oil additives in the United States. Bardahl's oil additive was advertised during the 1950s in magazines and animated TV commercials which showed the product's effectiveness in combating engine problems such as "Dirty Sludge", "Sticky Valves," "Gummy Rings," and "Blackie Carbon," all of which were anthropomorphized in the commercials.

1960s
In the early 1960s York Research Corporation, an independent commercial testing laboratory of Glenbrook, Connecticut conducted controlled testing on Bardahl. As the result of those tests, York President Warren C. Hyer was featured in regional and national Bardahl television advertisements touting the benefits of Bardahl as an oil additive. For many years the York Research company seal could be found on all cans of Bardahl.

Miss Bardahl
The company remains prominent as a result of its sponsorship of motor sports competitors. The Miss Bardahl Hydroplane was a six-time National Champion and five-time Gold Cup winner, racing in the United States from 1957 to 1969.

Ole was inducted into the Motorsports Hall of Fame of America in 2014.

Today
Bardahl can be found in more than 90 countries. The Bardahl product line includes 250 products, including engine oils, motor oil and fuel additives, and specialty lubricants. The company has expanded to foreign markets, opening plants in countries such as France, Belgium, Italy, Argentina, México, Brazil and Singapore.

Sponsorships
Bardahl has been involved in racing, using events as proving grounds for its products, as well as for the new technologies produced by the company's research and development arm. Types included Unlimited Hydroplanes, offshore powerboats, unlimited air racing, IndyCars, CART Racing, NASCAR, motorcycle and snowmobile racing. Al Young's Bardahl sponsored World Championship winning 1970 Dodge Challenger is part of the Museum of History and Industry (MOHAI) artifact collection in Seattle, WA. Formula 1 drivers such as Fangio, Guerney and Fittipaldi are associated with the Bardahl brand.
Bardhal products were often given away as promotional products to studio audience members or contestants on The Gong Show

OEM recognition
Bardahl has network of distributors in 90 countries under brands such as Bardahl and Protex by Bardahl. Formulations meet or exceed OEM Top Tier Performance requirements for the automotive industry: Audi - BMW - Chrysler - Citroën - Ferrari - Fiat - Ford - GM - Honda - Hyundai - Mazda - Mercedes - Mitsubishi - Peugeot - Porsche - Renault - Volkswagen

Notes

References
 The Ole Bardahl Story (James W. Phillips. Sons of Norway, 60:46. March, 1963)
Trønderen Ole Bardahl kom til USA (Brooklyn, NY: Nordisk Tidende.  Volume 22,  July 11, 1963) Norwegian
 Seattle’s Ole Bardahl - Trønder og multi-millionær (Henning C. Boe. Western Viking, Volume 24, May 19, 1967)

External links

Motor oils
Petroleum products